I. tricolor  may refer to:
 Ichthyophis tricolor, a caecilian species found in India
 Inocybe tricolor, a mushroom species widely distributed in temperate forests
 Ipomoea tricolor, a morning glory species native to the New World tropics

See also
 Tricolor (disambiguation)